Kampong Krasang Commune is a khum (commune) in Bourei Cholsar District, Takéo Province, Cambodia.

Administration 
As of 2019, Kampong Krasang Commune has five phums (villages) as follows.

References 

Communes of Takéo province
Bourei Cholsar District